Holcocera gargantuella is a moth in the family Blastobasidae. It is found in the United States, including Arizona.

Larvae have been reared from galls found on Quercus alba, as well as Cynipidae-galls.

References

Moths described in 1920
gargantuella